is a Japanese football player. He plays for Ehime FC.

Club statistics
Updated to end of 2018 season.

References

External links
Profile at Ehime FC

1992 births
Living people
Waseda University alumni
Association football people from Tokyo
Japanese footballers
J2 League players
J3 League players
Ehime FC players
Omiya Ardija players
Association football midfielders